Eriophorum gracile is a species of flowering plant in the sedge family, Cyperaceae. It is known by the common name slender cottongrass, or slender cottonsedge. Eriophorum gracile is a plant with circumboreal distribution, extending south into mountain ranges of the Northern Hemisphere. It grows in wet areas such as bogs.

Eriophorum gracile is a thin, tall perennial herb with a slender, rounded, solid, mostly naked stem reaching 30 to 60 centimeters in height. It produces a fluffy inflorescence atop its stem with a wispy, cottony white flower. The plants grow in colonies, often spreading vegetatively by rhizome.

References

External links
Jepson Manual Treatment

gracile
Plants described in 1799
Flora of Asia
Flora of North America
Flora of Europe